Julius Čoček (20 February 1900 – 7 September 1941) was a Czech equestrian. He competed in two events at the 1936 Summer Olympics.

References

External links
 

1900 births
1941 deaths
Czech male equestrians
Olympic equestrians of Czechoslovakia
Equestrians at the 1936 Summer Olympics
People from Přerov District
Sportspeople from the Olomouc Region